Lucia Peretti (born 14 November 1990) is an Italian short track speed skater.

Career
Peretti competed at the 2010 Winter Olympics for Italy. She was a member of the Italian 3000 metre relay team. She did not race in the semifinals, where the team finished fourth, but did in the B Final, finishing third and ending up sixth overall.

As of 2013, Peretti's best performance at the World Championships came in 2012, finishing 4th as a member of the Italian relay team. She also won a bronze medal at the 2010 World Short Track Speed Skating Team Championships for Italy, and a gold medal at the World Junior Championships.

As of 2013, Peretti has six ISU Short Track Speed Skating World Cup podium finishes, all as part of the Italian relay team. Her best finishes are a pair of silver medals in 2008–09. Her best finish in the World Cup rankings is 20th, in the 1500 metres in 2013–14.

World Cup Podiums

References

1990 births
Living people
Italian female short track speed skaters
Olympic short track speed skaters of Italy
Olympic silver medalists for Italy
Olympic bronze medalists for Italy
Olympic medalists in short track speed skating
Short track speed skaters at the 2010 Winter Olympics
Short track speed skaters at the 2014 Winter Olympics
Short track speed skaters at the 2018 Winter Olympics
Medalists at the 2014 Winter Olympics
Medalists at the 2018 Winter Olympics
World Short Track Speed Skating Championships medalists
People from Sondalo
Sportspeople from the Province of Sondrio